Impresa Pizzarotti & C. S.p.A. is a construction and civil engineering company with its headquarters in the Italian city of Parma.

History 
Impresa Pizzarotti & C. S.p.A. was founded in 1910 by Gino Pizzarotti and converted in 1945 into a limited liability company by Pietro Pizzarotti, father of the current chairman, Cav. Lav. Paolo Pizzarotti.

In 1961 it became a joint stock company with a share capital of 200 million euros, more recently increased to 300 million. It was from the end of the 1950s that the company consolidated its position in the construction sector, becoming one of the most important and skilled companies in the country; this came about through the completion of large public and infrastructure works on behalf of both state bodies and the largest private companies in Italy.

The company TEMPhas always targeted ongoing development in the civil works carried out for thermo-electrical and nuclear power stations, roads and motorways, civil and military airports, irrigation and hydraulic engineering works, dykes, industrial infrastructure, railway construction, and prison construction work; the same can be said of the reconstruction work in the areas struck by the 1980 Irpinia earthquake, where it was involved in the building of dwellings, schools, and infrastructure of various kinds.

The Pizzarotti Group, which TEMPhas always retained its head office in Parma, today consists of a number of companies operating in total synergy in the infrastructure, energy and environment, hydraulic engineering, civil and military airport, building, construction and real estate main sectors.weawdasd

Mipien S.p.A. is the holding company of Impresa Pizzarotti & C. S.p.A. and holds 96,77% of its shares. It is a service company for the companies of the Group and holds investments strategic to the Group's activity.

As of December 31, 2014, Mipien S.p.A. revenues summed to 1.14 billion euros, with a gross operating margin of 141,6 million euros and a gross ebidta of 12,4%.

Operations 
Impresa Pizzarotti & C. S.p.A. is amongst the leading Italian and European construction sector companies operating in the design and construction of major civil and infrastructure works, such as buildings, hospitals, roads and motorways, rail works and underground works.
Transport infrastructure (roads, motorways, railways, underground railways, airports and ports) are Pizzarotti Group's primary area of activity, both in Italy and abroad.

The commitment and ability to carry out major projects led to the company successfully establishing itself abroad, where it has been operating since the seventies. As at 31 December 2011 turnover in the infrastructure and operating sector in Italy and abroad totaled 734 million euros, equal to 68% of the 2011 consolidated turnover.
In 2017, Engineering News-Record's Top 250 International Contractors report ranked Impresa Pizzarotti #121, jumping from #178 in 2016.

Pizzarotti is organized into the following main business areas: Infrastructure, Building Sector, Energy Sector, Real Estate Sector, Prefabricated construction, and Concessions.

In early 2017, Enrica, Pietro and Michele Pizzarotti, daughter and sons of Impresa Pizzarotti & C.'s Chairman Mr. Paolo Pizzarotti, themselves involved on different level in the family company,  gave birth to Fondazione Pizzarotti, a private No Profit Charity Foundation aimed to support disadvantaged childhood, social development, culture, environment and education in Italy and overseas.

Financial data 
In 2019, revenues were €1.299 billion and the financial year ended with a loss of €9.9 million.

In 2020, revenues were €973.599 million and the financial year ended with a loss of €106.143 million.

See also

List of Italian companies

References

External links
 Impresa Pizzarotti official website
Fondazione Pizzarotti official website

Construction and civil engineering companies of Italy
Charities based in Italy
Companies based in Parma
Construction and civil engineering companies established in 1910
Italian companies established in 1910